Thomas Benjamin Lancashire  (born 2 July 1985 in Bolton, Greater Manchester) is an English middle-distance runner. Lancashire represented Great Britain at the 2008 Summer Olympics in the 1500 m.

Tom is a life member of Bolton Harriers and regularly races in club colours.   

Lancashire studied exercise science at Florida State University.

Biography 
He went to Turton School in Bromley Cross, Bolton.

He is a talented all round sportsman having previously taken part in many sports including football, swimming, cricket, ice hockey and snowboarding.

He attributes his early success to his first coach Jack Caldwell who brought him into the sport. Tom is a massive Manchester United fan.

Athletics career 
He began his athletics career after being spotted running in a school cross country race and being asked to train with Bolton Harriers.

In 2002 he won the English Schools' Athletics Championships 1500 metres title, being beaten by Lee Emanuel in his heat before beating him in the final.

In 2003, he represented Great Britain at the European Junior Championships, in the 1500 metres. The event was a straight final and he won a silver medal, finishing just over half a second behind the winner. He retained his English Schools' Athletics Championships 1500 metres title that year, winning his heat on his way to recording 3:47.78 in the final and winning the final by almost four seconds. He also won the AAA British Junior 1500 metres title by over 6 seconds.

In 2004, he competed at the World Junior Championships, running in the 1500 metres. He set a personal best of 3:42.48 in his heat, finishing third in the final automatic qualification spot. In the final he finished sixth, running a slower time than in his heat. He retained his British Junior title, winning by over eight seconds.

He also moved to America that year to study at Florida State University, which he left in 2007.

In 2005, he again represented Great Britain, this time at the European U23 Championships in the 1500 metres. He came fourth in the first heat, qualifying automatically for the final. In the final he finished last, by over 15 seconds.

In 2007, he competed in the European Cross Country Championships in the U23 age group, finishing nineteenth.

In 2008, he competed at the Bislett Games as part of the IAAF Golden League, winning the 1500 metres. He competed at the Olympics later that year in the 1500 metres. He did not make it out of his heats, finishing 2 seconds behind the winner of the heat and eventual champion Asbel Kiprop.

In 2009, he competed at the World Championships over 1500 metres. He finished eighth in his heat, three places outside the automatic qualification places.

In 2010, he competed in the Commonwealth Games over 1500 metres for England. He came fourth in his heat, qualifying easily before the final. He finished eighth in the final. He also competed at the European Championships that year in the 1500 metres. He came third in his heat, qualifying for the final. He came tenth out of twelve in the final.

In 2012, he competed at the  European Championships, he competed in the 1500 metres, finishing tenth in his heat and failing to qualify for the final.

In 2014, after almost two years out of the sport through injury and illness, he finished fourth in the 5000 metres at the British Championships as he looked to step up to that distance in the future.

In 2015, he competed at the British Indoor Championships, coming third in the 3000 metres. This meant that he qualified for the European Indoor Championships over 3000 metres. He ran in the second heat, finishing eleventh and failing to qualify for the final. He also competed at the British Athletics Championships in the 1500 metres, making it through the heats to come sixth in a time of 3:51.78. Also that year he competed over the short course in the Great Edinburgh International Cross Country, being the first Briton to finish, and finishing fifth overall.

In 2016, he began his outdoor season at an IAAF World Challenge meeting, the Golden Spike in Ostrava over the 1500 metres. He ran 3:39.95 to come ninth. He also competed at the Diamond League in Birmingham, over 1500 metres. He ran 3:37.77 to come tenth. At the end of the year Lancashire made an agreement to be trained by Steve Cram after splitting from his previous coach Steve Vernon.

Personal bests
 Outdoor
 800 metres — 1:45.76 (13 May 2006)
 1500 metres — 3:33.96  (27 August 2010)
 One mile — 3:53.39 (14 August 2010)
 5000 metres — 13:34.44 (29 April 2009)
 Indoor
 Mile run — 3:58.52 (2 March 2006)
 3000 metres — 8:00.95 (3 February 2007)

References

External links 
 
 
 College boy Tom Lancashire moves up in class from The Times
 

1985 births
Living people
Sportspeople from Bolton
English male middle-distance runners
British male middle-distance runners
Olympic athletes of Great Britain
Athletes (track and field) at the 2008 Summer Olympics
Commonwealth Games competitors for England
Athletes (track and field) at the 2010 Commonwealth Games
World Athletics Championships athletes for Great Britain
British Athletics Championships winners
Florida State Seminoles men's track and field athletes